Kim Nowak is a Polish rock band. It was founded in 2008 by hip-hop artist Bartosz "Fisz" Waglewski, producer Piotr "Emade" Waglewski and Michał Sobolewski.

The band name is a Polish spelling variant of the name of American actress Kim Novak. In an interview with Newsweek, Piotr Waglewski said the band's intention was to refer to the 1960s.

Disambiguation: Kimnowak was a Hungarian alternative rock band, active between 1993-2003, best known of its hit Gyémánt.

History

Kim Nowak (2008–2011)
As Waglewski brothers had been present on the Polish hip-hop music scene for over a decade, they started Kim Nowak in 2008 as a side-project to "fulfill their boyhood dreams of playing this kind of music" and to "pay tribute to groups like Fugazi or Black Keys".

Their debut album, titled Kim Nowak, was recorded in August 2009 and released on 14 May 2010 through Universal Music Poland. The single promoting the album, titled "Szczur" ("Rat"), was accompanied by a music video directed by Tomasza Nalewajek and Marcin Nowak. The album was nominated for the Polish music award Fryderyk in the Rock Album of the Year category.

On 28 August 2010, the band played at Orange Warsaw Festival. On 2 July 2011, Kim Nowak performed at the Tent Stage at Open'er Festival, alongside artists like Kate Nash, Chapel Club and The Asteroids Galaxy Tour.

Wilk (2011–present)
Kim Nowak released their second studio album, Wilk (Wolf), on 6 November 2012 through Universal Music Poland. Although the band didn't stop searching for inspiration in the rock music of the 1960s, Wilk represents a different music direction than their debut album: garage sounds and screams made more room for compositions with a calm and dark climate, sometimes resembling a soundtrack for a David Lynch or Tarantino film. The album featured guest appearances by Izabela Skrybant Dziewiątkowska of Tercet Egzotyczny and Tomek Duda of Pink Freud. All songs were composed by Kim Nowak, lyrics were written by Bartosz Waglewski and the album was produced by Piotr Waglewski.

In 2012, the band performed at Coke Live Music Festival in Cracow. On 4 July 2013, they played as one of the supports for Arctic Monkeys at the main stage at Open'er Festival in Gdynia.

Musical style
In an official press statement prior to the release of the debut album Kim Nowak, the band wrote:

Band members
 Bartosz Waglewski – vocals, bass guitar (2008–present)
 Piotr Waglewski – drums (2008–present)
 Michał Sobolewski – guitar (2008–present)

Discography

Albums
{| class="wikitable plainrowheaders" style="text-align:center;" border="1"
! scope="col" rowspan="2" style="width:8em;"|Title
! scope="col" rowspan="2" style="width:16em;"| Album details
! scope="col" colspan="1"| Peak chart positions
|-
! scope="col" style="width:3em;font-size:90%;"| POL
|-
! scope="row" | Kim Nowak'|
 Released: 14 May 2010
 Label: Universal Music Poland
| 8
|-
! scope="row" | Wilk|
 Released: 6 November 2012
 Label: Universal Music Poland
| 14
|}

Awards and nominations
Fryderyk

|-
| 2011 || Kim Nowak'' || Album of the Year – Rock ||

References

External links
Kim Nowak official website
Kim Nowak at Culture.pl

Polish rock music groups